Chaloem Rattanakosin National Park, also known as Tham Than Lot National Park (อุทยานแห่งชาติถ้ำธารลอด), is a national park in Kanchanaburi Province, Thailand. The park, featuring mountains, caves and waterfalls, is part of the Western Forest Complex protected area.

Geography
With an area of 36,875 rai ~ , it is the smallest park in Kanchanaburi Province.

History
Artefacts and human remains, thought to be from invading Burmese soldiers at end of the Ayutthaya Kingdom period, have been discovered in the park.

On 12 February 1980, Chaloem Rattanakosin was designated Thailand's 17th national park.

Attractions
The park's main attractions are its cave systems.  long Tham Than Lot Noi features many large stalactites and stalagmites. Tham Than Lot Yai also features stalactites and stalagmites in addition to being a site where ancient skeletal remains and weapons have been found.

Chaloem Rattanakosin also features some waterfalls. Than Thong is a waterfall of 15 levels. Than Ngoen is a smaller waterfall of seven levels.

Flora and fauna
The park's forests consist of dry evergreen, dipterocarp, deciduous and bamboo forest. Tree species include Pterocarpus macrocarpus, Afzelia xylocarpa, Hopea odorata and Dipterocarpus alatus.

Animal species include tiger, leopard, banteng, gaur and gibbon. Bird life includes oriental pied hornbill, francolin, Tickell's blue flycatcher and coppersmith barbet. A notable inhabitant of the park is a rare barking tree frog, whose croak resembles a dog's bark.

See also
List of national parks of Thailand
List of Protected Areas Regional Offices of Thailand

References

National parks of Thailand
Geography of Kanchanaburi province
Tourist attractions in Kanchanaburi province
1980 establishments in Thailand
Protected areas established in 1980